Archedino-Chernushinsky is a rural locality (a khutor) in Archedinskoye Rural Settlement, Frolovsky District, Volgograd Oblast, Russia. The population was 270 as of 2010.

Geography 
Archedino-Chernushinsky is located in steppe on east of Frolovsky District, 43 km northeast of Prigorodny (the district's administrative centre) by road. Mansky is the nearest rural locality.

References 

Rural localities in Frolovsky District